Southern College of Engineering & Technology is a private engineering college situated in Chalakudy, Thrissur District of Kerala, India. The college is approved by the Directorate General of Civil Aviation, New Delhi.

References

Engineering colleges in Thrissur district
Education in Chalakudy